Eriogenes nielseni is a moth in the family Depressariidae. It was described by Edward David Edwards in 2003. It is found in Australia, where it has been recorded from Queensland.

References

Moths described in 2003
Eriogenes